Nawabzada Mansoor Ahmed Khan is a Pakistani politician who had been a member of the Provincial Assembly of Punjab from August 2018 till January 2023. He was the Minister of Revenue of Punjab under Pervaiz Elahi.

Early life and education
Nawabzada Mansoor Ahmed Khan was born on August 10, 1953 to Nawabzada Nasrullah Khan at Khangarh, Punjab. He has graduated from College and he is an agriculturist. He has traveled to the UK, Iran, and Saudi Arabia. His father, Nawabzada Nasrullah Khan was a Member of Punjab Legislative Assembly during 1951-55; Member of National Assembly for four terms during 1962-64, 1977, 1988–90 and 1993-96 and also served as Chairman of Kashmir Committee. Mansoors' brother, Iftikhar Ahmed Khan Babar is a member of PPP and is a sitting MNA.

Political career
He served as a Member of the Provincial Assembly of Punjab for four consecutive terms during 1988-99 and is currently serving his fifth term since 2018 General Elections. He has served as Minister of Revenue for two terms during 1990-93 and 1993-96.

He was elected to the Provincial Assembly of Punjab as a candidate of Pakistan Tehreek-e-Insaf from Constituency PP-271 (Muzaffargarh-IV) in the 2018 general elections.

Family Tree

References

Living people
Pakistan Tehreek-e-Insaf MPAs (Punjab)
Punjab MPAs 2018–2023
Finance Ministers of Pakistan
1953 births
People from Muzaffargarh
Politicians from Muzaffargarh